Yadanabon Market is Mandalay's second-largest market. It is between 77th and 33nd and 34rd streets, near the Mandalay Central Railway Station. The market is now beside the Diamond Plaza.

The market was previously housed on the ground floor of Skywalk Shopping Mall, a five-storey complex that included a shopping mall on the first floor and restaurants and offices of the Trading Association and MICT Park on the second floor. The shopping mall was built in 2003.

A fire destroyed Yadanabon Market in February 2008. The fire burned for 13 hours, destroying 1,558 shops and injuring 21 people. 

In 2009, it was reconstructed as Diamond Plaza and Yadanabon Super Centre.

See also
Zegyo Market

References

Mandalay
Shopping malls and markets in Myanmar